Ernest-Marie Laperrousaz (2 August 1924 – 20 August 2013) was a French historian and archaeologist. As an archaeologist he worked at Qumran and Masada. He has published numerous books including works on Qumran and the context of the Dead Sea Scrolls.

Laperrousaz is now professeur honoraire of the religious studies faculty of the École pratique des hautes études and was formerly the director of that institution. He was a resident at the École biblique et archéologique française de Jérusalem. He has long been acquainted with Qumran, having been a participant in the excavations directed by Roland de Vaux from 1953 to 1956. From 1970 to 1995 Laperrousaz continued an archaeological mission to Jerusalem and the Qumran area on a yearly basis. Always a strong believer in the Qumran-Essene hypothesis, he differed with de Vaux over interpretations of the site of Qumran. His most influential work is Qoumran: L'Etablissement essénien des bord de la Mer Morte: Histoire et archéologie du site, an independent study of the archaeology of Qumran.

Selected publications 
Laperrousaz has been a prolific writer on archaeological subjects in French. Among his books are:
 Les Manuscrits de la mer Morte, Que sais-je?, 1961 ; 1984 ; 10e éd. mise à jour, 2003
 Qoumrân : L'établissement essénien des bords de la mer Morte, Histoire et archéologie du site, Picard, 1976
 Les Esséniens selon leur témoignage direct, Desclée, 1982
 Attente du Messie en Palestine à la veille et au début de l'ère chrétienne, Picard, 1982
 La Protohistoire d'Israël, de l'exode à la monarchie (dir.), Cerf, 1990
 La Palestine à l'époque perse (with André Lemaire), Cerf, 1994
 Salomon, roi d'Israël, Hachette Éducation, 2000
 Les Temples de Jérusalem, Paris-Méditerranée, 2000
 Trois Hauts Lieux de Judée : L'Hérodium, Massada et Qoumrân, Paris-Méditerranée, 2001
 Jésus : Les questions primordiales, Edimaf, 2002
 Problèmes d'histoire des religions : Mises au point, Paris-Méditerranée; 2006
 Qoumrân et ses manuscrits de la mer Morte, Non Lieu, 2006

References 
 Qoumran: L'Etablissement essenien by F.F. Bruce, Journal of Semitic Studies  24:1 (1979) 119–120
 Ernest-Marie Laperrousaz's obituary

External links 
 Ernest-Marie Laperrousaz on data.bnf.fr
 Short Biography
 List of publications on Persée
 Obituary on Société des études juives

Qumran
Dead Sea Scrolls
20th-century French historians
French archaeologists
Biblical archaeology
French historians of religion
Academic staff of the École pratique des hautes études
1924 births
2013 deaths